Weird War is the debut album by American indie rock band Weird War, released in 2002.

Track listing

Side one
"Baby It's the Best" − 2:55
"Chicago Charlemagne" − 2:35
"Who's Who" − 2:18
"FN Rat" − 3:25
"Grass" − 2:07
"Ibex Club" − 2:05

Side two
"Name Names" − 3:11
"Burgers and Fries" − 3:07
"I Live in a Dream" − 2:30
"Pick Up the Phone and Ball" − 2:05
"Family Cong" − 1:41
"Weird War" − 1:13
"Man is Money" − 2:37

Personnel
Stephen McCarty– drums, vocals
Jessica Espeleta – guitar, vocals
Neil Hagerty – guitar, vocals
Michelle Mae – bass, vocals
Ian Svenonius – vocals

References

2002 debut albums
Weird War albums
Drag City (record label) albums
Domino Recording Company albums